Kašperské Hory is a town in Klatovy District in the Plzeň Region of the Czech Republic. It has about 1,400 inhabitants. It is known as a ski resort. The town centre is well preserved and is protected by law as an urban monument zone.

Administrative parts
Villages of Červená, Dolní Dvorce, Kavrlík, Lídlovy Dvory, Opolenec, Podlesí, Tuškov and Žlíbek are administrative parts of Kašperské Hory.

Etymology
The Kašperk Castle that was built here by Charles IV was named after its founder Karlsberg ("Charles' Mountain" in German) and transcribed to Czech as Kašperk. The town was then named Kašperské Hory, meaning "Kašperk Mountains".

Geography

It lies on the border of the Bohemian Forest Foothills and Bohemian Forest mountain range. The Otava River flows along the western municipal border. The territory is rich in small creeks.

History

Kašperské Hory existed already at the turn of the 13th and 14th centuries as an extensive mining settlement near an important gold-bearing area. King John of Bohemia promoted the settlement to a mining town. The Kašperk Castle was built above the town by King Charles IV in 1356 to guard the border and protect the trade route and local gold mines. The castle also served as one of administrative centres of the Prácheňsko region. In 1584, the town became a royal town.

Declining gold mining was gradually replaced by trade, glassmaking, woodworking, papermaking and cattle breeding. In the 19th century, Kašperské Hory was the natural regional centre as the seat of offices and schools. It had a German majority. After the end of the World War II in 1945, the original German-speaking population was expelled according to the Potsdam agreement, and the town was repopulated with Czechs.

Demographics

Sport
The Kašperky ski area is located on Liščí vrch Hill. There are four ski slopes with three ski lifts, and a ski school. There are tracks for cross-country skiing around the town, covering 20 km.

Sights

The main landmark of the historic town centre is the Church of Saint Margaret. It was originally a Gothic church from the mid-14th century, first documented in 1396. It was modified several times, then in 1883 it was rebuilt in the neo-Gothic style and the tower was added.

There are two museums in the town. The Museum of Šumava features extensive exhibitions on glassmaking, gold mining, natural history and folklore, and seasonal exhibitions. The second museum is the Museum of Historical Motorcycles with the largest collection of historical motorcycles in the country.

Kašperk Castle is located north of the town proper. At the turn of the 16th and 17th centuries, the castle fell into disrepair and was abandoned. The royal chamber sold the castle to the town of Kašperské Hory in 1616, and it is owned by the town up to the present day. The castle ruin is open to the public and offers sightseeing tours.

Notable people
Johannes Cardinalis von Bergreichenstein (c. 1375 – after 1428), lawyer and diplomat
Kurt Raab (1941–1988), German actor

Twin towns – sister cities

Kašperské Hory is twinned with:
 Grafenau, Germany

References

External links

Cities and towns in the Czech Republic
Populated places in Klatovy District
Prácheňsko
Bohemian Forest
Ski areas and resorts in the Czech Republic